Richard Edgcumbe (sometimes spelt Edgecumbe and Edgecombe) may refer to:

 Sir Richard Edgcumbe (died 1489) (c. 1440–1489), courtier and politician, fought at Bosworth
 Sir Richard Edgcumbe (died 1562), courtier and politician
 Sir Richard Edgcumbe (died 1639), Cornish MP 1586 to 1628
 Sir Richard Edgcumbe (politician) (1640–1688), MP for Launceston and Cornwall
 Richard Edgcumbe, 1st Baron Edgcumbe (1680–1758), British peer and politician
 Richard Edgcumbe, 2nd Baron Edgcumbe (1716–1761), British peer and politician
 Richard Edgcumbe, 2nd Earl of Mount Edgcumbe (1764–1839)
Richard Edgecombe (born c.1540), MP for Totnes

See also 
 Edgcumbe (disambiguation)